Reginald Woodhouse (3 May 1877 – 16 February 1965) was an Australian rules footballer who played with Melbourne in the Victorian Football League (VFL).

Notes

External links 

 

1877 births
1965 deaths
Australian rules footballers from Victoria (Australia)
Melbourne Football Club players
Collegians Football Club players
Australian military personnel of World War I
Australian rules footballers from Perth, Western Australia
Military personnel from Victoria (Australia)